Cottage Grove is an unincorporated community in Cottage Township, Saline County, Illinois, United States.

Cottage Grove Cemetery sits across the road from the old Cottage Grove school. The community sits to the east of Southeastern Illinois College.

References

Unincorporated communities in Saline County, Illinois
Unincorporated communities in Illinois